Alexander Alexandrovich Frolov (born June 19, 1982) is a Russian professional ice hockey player currently playing for the Daemyung Killer Whales of the Asia League Ice Hockey (ALIH).  In an eight-year National Hockey League (NHL) career, he played with the Los Angeles Kings and the New York Rangers. After Frolov's NHL career ended, he moved to the KHL with Avangard Omsk and CSKA Moscow.

Playing career
Frolov was drafted by the Los Angeles Kings in the first round, 20th overall, in the 2000 NHL Entry Draft. He had been playing in Russia's third-tier hockey league with Lokomotiv-2 Yaroslavl, then stayed in Russia for two more seasons, moving up to the second-tier Russian Supreme League (RSL) and first-tier Russian Super League (RSL) with Krylya Sovetov Moscow.

Signed to a three-year contract with the Kings in July 2002, Frolov made his NHL debut in 2002 for the Kings, scoring his first NHL goal, a game-winner, in his seventh game on October 25 against Mike Richter of the New York Rangers.  Frolov finished his rookie season with 14 goals and 31 points. After improving to a team-high 24 goals and 48 points the following season, Frolov returned to the Russian Super League in 2004–05 due to the NHL lockout. He began the season with CSKA Moscow and finished second in team scoring to Nikolay Zherdev, despite completing the campaign with Dynamo Moscow.

Frolov became a restricted free agent before the 2005–06 season and after turning down a three-year deal, he signed a longer, five-year, $14.5 million contract in August 2005.  In the first year of his new contract, he scored his first NHL hat-trick on November 13, 2005, in an 8–2 victory over the Columbus Blue Jackets.  Later that season, Frolov was named to Russia's 2006 Winter Olympic team in Turin, where he suffered a partially separated shoulder. He missed approximately a month with the Kings when he returned, but still managed a 54-point season in 69 games.

In 2006–07, Frolov continued to improve and recorded a career-high 35 goals and 71 points, second in team point-scoring to Michael Cammalleri. He finished second in team-scoring for the second consecutive year to Anže Kopitar in 2007–08 with 67 points, despite missing 11 games due to a groin injury suffered in November.

An unrestricted free agent after the 2009–10 season, Frolov signed with the New York Rangers on July 27, 2010, on a one-year, $3 million contract. On January 8, 2011, he suffered a torn anterior cruciate ligament (ACL) of the right knee after forward Brad Winchester fell over Frolov's leg. The injury forced him to miss the remainder of the 2010–11 season after he underwent surgery to repair the damage. Frolov registered seven goals and nine assists for 16 points, along with eight penalty minutes, in 43 games during his only season with the Rangers.

On May 12, 2011, Frolov left the NHL and signed a three-year contract with Russian team Avangard Omsk of the KHL. On November 5, 2013, Avangard Omsk traded Frolov and Stanislav Egorsheva to CSKA Moscow in exchange for Sergei Shirokov and Maxim Goncharov.

On September 15, 2014, Frolov announced his retirement from professional hockey, citing the effect of knee injuries he had sustained since 2011. However, after a season out of the game, Frolov returned on July 7, 2015, signing a one-year contract with former club Torpedo Nizhny Novgorod of the KHL.

In July 2018, after seven seasons in the KHL, Frolov signed with South Korean club Daemyung Killer Whales from Songdo, Incheon of the Asia League Ice Hockey (ALIH).

International play

Frolov represented Russia on two occasions as a junior at the 2000 World Junior U18 Championships in Switzerland and 2001 World Junior Championships in the Czech Republic, where he earned a gold medal.  He scored a goal in the 5–4 gold medal game victory over Canada and finished with a team-high six goals and eight points in seven games.

After completing his rookie season with the Los Angeles Kings, Frolov debuted at the senior level with Russia at the 2003 World Championships and scored five points as Russia failed to medal. He made his second World Championships appearance in 2007, tallying an international personal best 11 points in nine games. Playing as the host nation, Russia earned bronze defeating Sweden 3–1 in the bronze medal game.

Frolov also competed in the 2004 World Cup, where he managed two assists in four games. He was selected to his first Winter Olympics for the 2006 games in Turin. However, Frolov was injured early in the tournament, suffering a partially separated shoulder in a round-robin game against Kazakhstan.  He missed the remainder of Russia's games as they were defeated 3–0 by Finland in the semi-final game.

Frolov was selected as a reserve by Russia for the 2010 Winter Olympics in Vancouver should an injury occur during the tournament.

Career statistics

Regular season and playoffs

International

References

External links

1982 births
Living people
Amur Khabarovsk players
Avangard Omsk players
HC CSKA Moscow players
Daemyung Killer Whales players
HC Dynamo Moscow players
Ice hockey players at the 2006 Winter Olympics
Krylya Sovetov Moscow players
Los Angeles Kings draft picks
Los Angeles Kings players
National Hockey League first-round draft picks
New York Rangers players
Olympic ice hockey players of Russia
Ice hockey people from Moscow
Russian ice hockey left wingers
HC Spartak Moscow players
Torpedo Nizhny Novgorod players